Saudi Telecommunication Company (stylized as stc; Arabic: شركة إتصالات السعودية) is the Saudi digital enabler of telecommunications services in the Kingdom of Saudi Arabia, and among the operators in the Middle East. The company offers landline and fixed infrastructure, mobile and data services. stc offers mobile, broadband and cloud computing services. The company invested in next-generation networks, or NGNs, upgraded to packet-based architecture where information, services and media can be carried across the network.

Company history
stc was established as a Saudi Joint Stock Company pursuant to Royal Decree No. M/35 dated April 21, 1998 which authorized the transfer of the Telegraph and Telephone division of the Ministry of Post, Telegraph and Telephone (MoPTT) with its various components and technical and administrative facilities, to the company, and in accordance with the Council of Ministers Resolution No. 213 dated April 20, 1998 which approved the company Articles of Association. The company was wholly owned by the Government of the Kingdom of Saudi Arabia, Pursuant to the Council of Ministers Resolution No. 171 dated September 9, 2002 the Government sold 30% of its shares. At least 20% were appropriated for natural Saudi nationals and no more than 10% were appropriated equally for the Public Pension Fund and General Organization for Social Security. The Initial Public Offering (IPO) was ended on January 2003) and The Council of Ministers, as the extraordinary general assembly of the company, approved, in accordance with resolution No. 171 mentioned above, the acceptance to increase the Company capital from SR12,000 million to SR15,000 million, by transferring from retained earning to capital. On April 11, 2006, the Company extraordinary General Assembly, approved the increase of the Company share capital from SR 15,000 million to SR 20,000 million through a stock dividend of one bonus share for each three outstanding shares through a transfer from the retained earnings to the capital The company commenced its operations as the provider of telecommunications services throughout the Kingdom of Saudi Arabia on May 2, 1998 and received its commercial registration No. 1010150269 as a Saudi Joint Stock Company on June 29, 1998 The company's headquarters is located in Riyadh.

Secondary share offering 
Saudi Arabia's Public Investment Fund (PIF) has sold 120 million shares in Saudi Telecom Company (stc) for $3.2 billion after completing a secondary share offering of the kingdom's largest mobile operator.  Saudi Arabia's government owns 64% of the major telecom through PIF.

In June 2022, an $8 billion increase in capital was proposed that would represent 150% capital increase to finance its growth and expansion plans.

Services
STC services are divided into three broad categories: Al-Jawal (mobile network), Al-Hatif (landline network), Stc-Pay (Digital Payment) and Enterprise services.
 Mobile computing
 Internet Services
 Television Services
 Digital Payment & Provider (STC Pay)

Chairman
 Prince Mohammed K. ALFaisal, independent

STC subsidiaries

In February 2022, it was announced that STC subsidiary, TAWAL, has acquired the Pakistani company, AWAL Telecom Private Limited - an independent passive telecommunications tower provider, for an undisclosed sum. AWAL will be rebranded as TAWAL Pakistan.

References

External links
 

Telecommunications companies established in 1998
Telecommunications companies of Saudi Arabia
Saudi Arabian brands
Mobile phone companies of Saudi Arabia
Companies based in Riyadh
Saudi Arabian companies established in 1998
Public Investment Fund
Telecommunications companies of Pakistan